Transcription factor AP-2 beta also known as AP2-beta is a protein that in humans is encoded by the TFAP2B gene.

Function 

AP-2 beta is a member of the AP-2 family of transcription factors. AP-2 proteins form homo- or hetero-dimers with other AP-2 family members and bind specific DNA sequences. They are thought to stimulate cell proliferation and suppress terminal differentiation of specific cell types during embryonic development. Specific AP-2 family members differ in their expression patterns and binding affinity for different promoters. This protein functions as both a transcriptional activator and repressor.

Clinical significance 

Mutations in this gene result in autosomal dominant Char syndrome, suggesting that this gene functions in the differentiation of neural crest cell derivatives.

References

Further reading

External links
 
  GeneReviews/NCBI/NIH/UW entry on Char Syndrome

Transcription factors